Marc-André ter Stegen (born 30 April 1992) is a German professional footballer who plays as a goalkeeper for La Liga club Barcelona and the Germany national team. Regarded as a highly promising player in his youth, he has since established himself as one of the best goalkeepers in world football. Known for his reflexes, passing, and ball-playing ability, he has been often nicknamed as the Berlin Wall because of his reflexes and ball control abilities as a goalkeeper.

After four seasons in the Bundesliga with Borussia Mönchengladbach, making 108 league appearances, he joined Barcelona for €12 million in 2014. He won the treble in his first season in Spain, playing for Barcelona in Copa del Rey and UEFA Champions League.

Ter Stegen represented Germany at several youth levels and made his senior international debut in 2012. He was part of the German squads that reached the semi-finals of UEFA Euro 2016 and won the 2017 FIFA Confederations Cup, and was also a member of the German side that took part at the 2018 FIFA World Cup.

Club career

Borussia Mönchengladbach

2010–11 season
Ter Stegen began his career at hometown team Borussia Mönchengladbach. In the first half of the 2010–11 season, he established himself as the star of their reserve team and was frequently seen on the first-team bench. Whilst he was enjoying a relatively successful season, the same could not be said for his first-team colleagues. Mönchengladbach's senior side were seemingly failing in their efforts to avoid relegation, and on 14 February 2011, manager Michael Frontzeck was replaced by Lucien Favre, with the team rooted to the bottom of the Bundesliga, having accumulated only 16 points after 22 match days.

The team’s results soon improved, but the erratic form of first-choice goalkeeper Logan Bailly held the team back. Whilst he was able to produce match-winning performances such as the one against Werder Bremen, these were few and far between, and were frequently cancelled out by uninspiring matches. The fans of Mönchengladbach were quick to discredit the Belgian international, with some accusing him of putting more effort into his modelling career than his football. Ter Stegen's progress for the reserve team had not gone unnoticed by the supporters, and the new manager was inundated with demands to start the young prodigy in the league. Favre eventually lost patience with Bailly, and on 10 April 2011, relegated him to the bench in favour of Ter Stegen for the match against 1. FC Köln. The young German did not disappoint, and the defence boasted a previously unseen solidity. He kept his place in the team for the remainder of the season, keeping four clean-sheets out of a possible five in the last five matchdays as Mönchengladbach avoided relegation via the playoffs. During this run, he shot to prominence with a last-man-standing display against eventual champions Borussia Dortmund, making a string of world-class saves as Mönchengladbach secured a famous 1–0 victory.

2011–12 season

Ter Stegen's status as first-choice goalkeeper was cemented when Bailly was sent on loan to Swiss side Neuchâtel Xamax and the no.1 shirt was delegated to Ter Stegen, who had previously worn 21.

During the summer transfer window, Bayern Munich had succeeded in their drawn-out pursuit of Schalke 04's captain Manuel Neuer. The German international made his debut against Ter Stegen's Mönchengladbach at the Allianz Arena. The match did not go the way the pundits predicted, however, with Ter Stegen producing yet another inspired display whilst his counterpart Neuer made the error that condemned Bayern to a 1–0 defeat. Following this match, Borussia Mönchengladbach embarked on an unlikely title challenge, with Ter Stegen and fellow youngster Marco Reus providing the inspiration for Mönchengladbach.

2012–13 season
After the departures of Reus to Borussia Dortmund and Dante to Bayern Munich, Ter Stegen emerged as Mönchengladbach's main star for the season. He was again first-choice, and in February 2013, it was reported that Ter Stegen signed a pre-agreement with La Liga club Barcelona. The deal was later denied by himself.

2013–14 season
After being strongly linked to Barcelona, Ter Stegen remained at Mönchengladbach for the new season. On 6 January 2014, he rejected a new deal from the club, raising the speculation over his future. In the last home match of the season, a 3–1 home success against Mainz 05 on 5 May, Ter Stegen sent a tearful goodbye to Borussia Mönchengladbach.

Barcelona

2014–15 season

On 19 May 2014, Ter Stegen was announced as the new goalkeeper of Spanish club Barcelona, with Chilean goalkeeper Claudio Bravo, after the departures of Víctor Valdés and José Manuel Pinto, effective during the summer transfer window. On 22 May 2014, he signed a five-year contract that would keep him at the club until June 2019. The transfer fee was €12 million (£9.7 million), and the buy-out clause was set to €80 million (£63.6 million). After the move, Ter Stegen said joining the club was the right move and that he aimed to settle at the club.

Ter Stegen sufferred an injury prior to the first league match of the season. Due to this injury, Barcelona manager Luis Enrique made Bravo the starting league goalkeeper, where he would go on to win the Zamora Trophy. Ter Stegen, ended up not playing at all in Barca's victorious league campaign Ter Stegen, however, was made the first-choice goalkeeper in both the Copa del Rey matches and in the UEFA Champions League. He made his debut in the latter tournament on 17 September, keeping a clean sheet in a 1–0 home win over APOEL. He helped Barcelona win the final of the domestic Copa Del Rey cup in his first season, a 3–1 victory against Athletic Bilbao on 30 May 2015. A week later, he played in the Champions League Final at the Olympiastadion in Berlin, a 3–1 win over Juventus. He won the "Best Save" award for his spectacular "goal-line" save against Bayern Munich, in the second leg of the Champions League semi-final.

2015–16 season
His second season opened with victory in the 2015 UEFA Super Cup against Sevilla in Tbilisi on 11 August. Having led 4–1, he then conceded three more goals to send the match into extra time, in which Barcelona won 5–4. He made his La Liga debut on 12 September 2015 in a match against Atlético Madrid, which Barcelona won 2–1.

In March 2016, Ter Stegen said on the subject of Luis Enrique's rotation policy: "In the long run, these 25 games per season are not enough for me. The decision is made by the coach. I hope that the quality I've shown recently is rewarded."

2016–17 season
Ter Stegen picked up injuries at the start of the season, due to which he missed the Supercopa de España and league matches. He became Barcelona's first-choice goalkeeper after Claudio Bravo left for Manchester City on 25 August 2016. On 13 September 2016, Ter Stegen gave away and saved a penalty from Moussa Dembélé which kept the score at 1–0 and which eventually led to a 7–0 victory for Barcelona against Celtic in the UEFA Champions League. On 2 October 2016, Ter Stegen had a poor performance when he made two crucial mistakes, which cost Barcelona the match, as they eventually went on to lose 4–3 against Celta Vigo. He later apologised and said that he would not change his playing style. He later received good reviews for his role in Barcelona's 6–1 comeback victory against Paris Saint-Germain in the 2nd leg of the Champions League round-of-16 for receiving a crucial foul from PSG midfielder Marco Verratti in the opposition half – which led to Sergi Roberto's crucial 94th-minute winner that kept Barcelona in the hunt for the Champions League. As a result, Barcelona qualified for the Champions League quarterfinals, where they were eventually eliminated by Juventus. Ter Stegen proved to be even more decisive in the second league El Clásico that season by producing a staggering 12 saves in a 3–2 victory at the Santiago Bernabéu against Real Madrid, which kept Barcelona alive in the race for La Liga while being three points adrift of Real Madrid.

2017–18 season
On 29 May 2017, Ter Stegen signed a new contract with Barcelona, keeping him at the club until 2022, with his buyout clause raised to €180 million.

On 14 October 2017, Ter Stegen made some critical saves, including two well-placed shots from Antoine Griezmann of Atlético Madrid, en route to a 1–1 draw at the newly-rebuilt Wanda Metropolitano, preserving Barcelona's unbeaten record in the 2017–18 La Liga season. On 28 October 2017, Ter Stegen produced a phenomenal display against Athletic Bilbao in an eventual 2–0 win for Barcelona, denying Aritz Aduriz from a one-on-one position and producing a brilliant diving effort from the same opponent with five minutes remaining on the clock. As of 20 November 2017, Ter Stegen, assisted by the guidance of the manager at that time Ernesto Valverde, along with the good form of teammate and defender Samuel Umtiti, was responsible for Barcelona having the fewest goals conceded of any club in Europe's top five leagues, with just four conceded. On 22 November 2017, Ter Stegen saved a 90th minute shot from Paulo Dybala of Juventus, which was similar to a shot he had scored against Ter Stegen in the previous season's Champions League defeat. The result was good enough to secure a draw and a first place position in Group D, qualifying Barcelona to the 2017–18 UEFA Champions League knockout phase. At this point, Ter Stegen had saved 23 of his last 24 shots on target for a 96 percent save percentage. 

On 17 April 2018, Ter Stegen captained Barcelona for the first time in a 2–2 draw against Celta Vigo at the Balaídos in the absence of regular captains Andrés Iniesta and Lionel Messi, with the latter starting on the bench.

2018–19 season

On 12 August, Ter Stegen started for Barcelona in the 2018 Supercopa de España, in which the club defeated Sevilla 2–1 to win the title, with Ter Stegen making a late penalty save to secure the victory.

Ter Stegen won his fourth La Liga title with Barcelona, and reached the semi-finals of the 2018–19 UEFA Champions League, where his team was eliminated from the competition after losing 3–4 on aggregate against Liverpool, including a 0–4 loss at Anfield in the second leg.

2019–20 season
On 28 September 2019, Ter Stegen provided an assist to Luis Suárez for the first goal in a 2–0 away win over Getafe, becoming the first Barcelona goalkeeper to provide an assist in La Liga in the 21st Century. On 6 October, Ter Stegen marked his 200th game for Barça with a clean sheet in a 4–0 home win against Sevilla. He provided another assist on 7 December to Antoine Griezmann for the first goal in a 5–2 home victory vs Mallorca.
For the first time in his Barça career ter Stegen kept five consecutive clean sheets. The fifth was against Athletic Bilbao in a 1–0 win on 23 June 2020. On 14 August 2020, he allowed eight goals in the 2–8 defeat against eventual winners Bayern Munich in the 2019-20 UEFA Champions League quarter-final in Lisbon.

2020–21 season
After the end of the previous season, it was announced that Ter Stegen underwent a successful knee surgery which would be keeping him out of the team for over two months. He missed several matches and was replaced by Neto.

On 20 October, Ter Stegen extended his contract with Barcelona that would keep him at the club till 30 June 2025, with a buy-out clause of €500 million.

On 24 November, Ter Stegen reached his 100th clean sheet with Barcelona in a 4–0 win over Dynamo Kyiv in a Champions League group stage match at the NSC Olimpiyskiy Stadium in Kyiv.

On 6 January 2021, in a 3–2 league victory against Athletic Bilbao at the San Mamés, Ter Stegen reached 250 appearances for Barcelona in all competitions, making him the goalkeeper with the fifth–most appearances in the club's history.

That year, he won the Copa del Rey with the club against the previous runners-up Athletic Bilbao 4–0.

2021–22 season
In this season Ter Stegen did not win any trophies with the side and came second in La Liga. Barcelona were knocked out in the Champions League group stage and then knocked out in the quarter-finals of the Europa League by Eintracht Frankfurt. This season ended with a 2–0 loss at home against Villarreal.

International career

In 2009, he participated on the winning team of the UEFA European Under-17 Championship.

Ter Stegen was rewarded for his performances by Joachim Löw, who called him up to Germany's provisional squad for UEFA Euro 2012. He made his debut on 26 May 2012, in the 5–3 loss against Switzerland in a friendly match, but did not make the final cut for the tournament. He stopped a penalty from Lionel Messi in his second international match in a 1–3 loss against Argentina on 15 August, immediately after coming on following Ron-Robert Zieler's sending off.

On 27 June 2015, he conceded five goals in Germany U21s' match against Portugal U21 in the semi-finals of the UEFA European Under-21 Championship in Czech Republic.

Ter Stegen was included in Germany's UEFA Euro 2016 squad, but remained on the bench throughout the entire tournament, as a back-up to starter Manuel Neuer; Germany reached the semi-finals, and were eliminated following a 2–0 loss to hosts France.

At the 2017 FIFA Confederations Cup, Ter Stegen started in all of his team's matches, apart from the first group-stage match, as Germany went on to win the tournament. For his performance in the final, against Chile, he was named the Man of the Match.

On 15 May 2018, Ter Stegen was included in Germany's 27-man squad for the 2018 FIFA World Cup. Germany's manager Joachim Löw included Ter Stegen in Germany's final 23-man squad for the World Cup on 4 June 2018.

In September 2019, Ter Stegen engaged in a minor war of words with Manuel Neuer over the number one goalkeeper spot for Germany.

In May 2021, Ter Stegen was omitted from Germany's UEFA Euro 2020 squad after opting to undergo surgery to treat an injury to the patellar tendon in his right knee.

Style of play
Ter Stegen has been described as a tall, agile and consistent goalkeeper, with quick reflexes, good decision-making and excellent shot-stopping abilities between the posts; he is also strong in the air, good in one-on-one situations, and effective at communicating with his back-line courtesy of his strong personality. Due to his ability to read the game and speed when rushing off his line, he is able to anticipate opponents outside the area who have beaten the offside trap. Being highly competent with the ball at his feet, he is known for his control and accurate distribution of the ball, and often functions as a sweeper-keeper, due to his ability to play the ball out from the back. He often uses his legs to close down players and to make crucial saves in what has been described as a 'German goalkeeping style'. Moreover, he possesses good fundamental goalkeeping technique, and a strong positional sense. In 2020, former Spain and Barcelona goalkeeper Salvador Sadurní noted that Ter Stegen's style of play is very similar to that of his German compatriot Manuel Neuer. Regarded as a highly promising player in his youth, he has since established himself as one of the best goalkeepers in world football.

Personal life
Ter Stegen was born in Mönchengladbach, North Rhine-Westphalia. He is of Dutch descent through his father. He married his longtime girlfriend, Daniela Jehle, in Sitges, near Barcelona. On 28 December 2019, she gave birth to their first child, Ben.

Career statistics

Club

International

Honours
Barcelona
 La Liga: 2014–15, 2015–16, 2017–18, 2018–19
 Copa del Rey: 2014–15, 2015–16, 2016–17, 2017–18, 2020–21
 Supercopa de España: 2018, 2023
 UEFA Champions League: 2014–15
 UEFA Super Cup: 2015
 FIFA Club World Cup: 2015

Germany U17
 UEFA European Under-17 Championship: 2009

Germany
 FIFA Confederations Cup: 2017

Individual
 UEFA European Under-17 Championship Team of the Tournament: 2009
 Fritz Walter Medal U17 Bronze: 2009
 Fritz Walter Medal U19 Gold: 2011
 kicker : 2011–12
 UEFA Champions League Squad of the Season: 2014–15, 2018–19
 UEFA Save of the Season: 2014–15
 UEFA Team of the Year: 2018
 ESM Team of the Year: 2017–18, 2018–19, 2019–20
Premi Barça Jugadors: 2018–19
Trofeo Aldo Rovira: 2019–20

References

External links

Profile at the FC Barcelona website

1992 births
Living people
Sportspeople from Mönchengladbach
Footballers from North Rhine-Westphalia
German footballers
Germany youth international footballers
Germany under-21 international footballers
Germany international footballers
Association football goalkeepers
Borussia Mönchengladbach II players
Borussia Mönchengladbach players
FC Barcelona players
Regionalliga players
Bundesliga players
La Liga players
UEFA Champions League winning players
UEFA Euro 2016 players
2017 FIFA Confederations Cup players
2018 FIFA World Cup players
2022 FIFA World Cup players
FIFA Confederations Cup-winning players
German expatriate footballers
Expatriate footballers in Spain
German expatriate sportspeople in Spain
German people of Dutch descent